Judenhass (German for "Jew hatred") may refer to:

 Traditional and religious anti-Judaism
 Antisemitism, discrimination against Jews on racial grounds
 Judenhass (comics), a 2008 comic book by Dave Sim